Barinia Station was a railway station on the Cleveland Line of Brisbane, Queensland, Australia. It opened in 1937 for passengers only and had no goods facilities. It closed in 1960 with the closure of the railway beyond Lota and was demolished soon after. It was not rebuilt when the line was reopened in 1987.

Namesake 

Not to be confused with Barinia railway siding, South Australia.

References 

Railway stations in Redland City
Disused railway stations in Queensland